James Longley is the name of:
James Longley (filmmaker), American documentary filmmaker
James B. Longley (1924–1980), governor of Maine
James B. Longley Jr. (born 1951), former U.S. Congressman from Maine
James Wilberforce Longley (1849–1922), Canadian journalist, lawyer, politician, and judge
Jim Longley (born 1958), Australian accountant and politician